Matthew Bauer is an American painter, sculptor and musician. He has released music under the alias of Mathieu Bauer but, as of 2015, has returned to the use of his real name. His album Night Demons released on So French Records reached #3 on Beatport's top Indie Dance / Nu Disco releases.

His artwork has been used by other musicians for CDs and promotional art, including the German synthpop/futurepop band Seabound's single "Travelling" released on dependent, cover artwork for the grindcore act Malefaction, and a ThouShaltNot album sleeve.

He is the composer of the score to the animated film Baby Layne (2005). It received the Audience Award at Brooklyn's 2005 Kids Filmfest.

He currently resides in Los Angeles, California.

Discography

LPs 
2015 Night Demons

EPs 
2005 "Malerhjerne" (EED)

Self released albums 
2006 Embryonic
2007 Galore
2010 Animal Magnetism

Compilations 
2005 Compilations 2005 (EED)
2015 So French Records Summer Compilation 5

Remixes 
2006 Ascalaphe Remixed – Micro (EED)
2015 Steige – Telios (The Remixes)

References

External links
So French Records Website
Brooklyn's Kids Filmfest Website
Dependent Records Website
G7 Welcoming Committee Website
Official Website

Year of birth missing (living people)
Living people
21st-century American painters
21st-century American male artists
American sculptors
American male singers
American male painters
American male pianists
American male guitarists
21st-century American pianists
21st-century American male musicians